The Rhythmic Gymnastics Junior European Championships are the European championships for junior gymnasts for the sport of rhythmic gymnastics. They were first held in 1987. Prior to 1993, they were held as a separate event. Since the 1993 edition in Bucharest, Romania, the Junior European Championships were integrated to the senior European Championships. The competition is organized by the European Union of Gymnastics.

Editions

Medalists

Teodora Alexandrova (Bulgaria), Dimitrinka Todorova (Bulgaria), Rosabel Espinosa (Spain), and Yelena Shalamova (Russia) hold the record of most medals earned at the Junior European Championships, with six medals each. Shalamova, Polina Shmatko (Russia) and Elizabeth Koleva (Bulgaria) hold the record for most gold medals, with five each.

Team
Junior Team event has been held since 2006 on two years. Teams consisted of 2-4 junior individual gymnasts. Since 2017, team competition is held every year and either consists of Junior individual gymnasts and Senior group or Senior individual gymnasts and Junior group.

Junior Individual

Rope

Hoop

Ball

Clubs

Ribbon

Junior Groups

All-Around
Junior Group All-Around has been held since 2011. It was not organized in 2017.

Single apparatus 
since 2019 there are two competitions with two different single apparatus

All-time medal table
1987–2022
 Last updated after the 2022 Rhythmic Gymnastics European Championship

External links
European Union of Gymnastics
European Rhythmic Timeline

 
Gymnastics Rhythmic
Recurring sporting events established in 1987
Rhythmic gymnastics competitions
Gymnastics in Europe